Ryazanaviatrans was an airline based in Turlatovo, Ryazan, Russia. It operated scheduled and charter regional feeder flights.

Code data
ICAO Code: RYZ
Callsign: Ryazan

History
The airline was established in 1992. On 31 October 2012, it was ordered to cease operations due to increased safety regulations. At that time, its aircraft fleet consisted of two Antonov An-24.

References

External links

 Ryazanaviatrans

Defunct airlines of Russia
Airlines established in 1992
Airlines disestablished in 2012
Companies based in Ryazan